The Golem and the Dancing Girl is a 1917 German silent comedy horror film. It is part of a trilogy, preceded by The Golem (1915) and followed by The Golem: How He Came into the World (1920). Paul Wegener and Rochus Gliese co-directed and acted in the film. Wegener also wrote the screenplay. This was the screen debut of Fritz Feld. It was produced by Deutsche Bioscop GmbH.

The Golem and the Dancing Girl is now considered a lost film, though silentera.com reports a print may exist in an "eastern European film archive". Troy Howarth wrote, "(the film) remains one of the earliest filmed examples of a horror spoof....makes it all the more regrettable that it has vanished so completely."

Plot 
Not much is known of the plot, since the film is considered lost, but it appears to have been a take-off spoofing the earlier 1915 film Der Golem. Wegener plays an actor who, upon discovering the fear his performance generates when he assumes the role of the Golem in a film, decides to wear the costume to a party he is to attend, in order to make an impression on a dancer (Salmanova) who will be there.

Cast 
Paul Wegener as the Golem. IMDb credits Wegener as playing the Golem (as he did in the other two films in the trilogy), while silentera.com states this role was played by Gliese. 
Lyda Salmonova as Helga
Rochus Gliese
Wilhelm Diegelmann
Fritz Feld as hotel page (under his birth name Friedrich Veilchenfeld)
Emilie Kurz
Mr. Meschugge
Erich Schönfelder
Ernst Waldow

Reception 
Troy Howarth wrote, "Not only is the film considered lost, it doesn't seem to have generated much notice upon its original release."

See also 
List of German films of 1895–1918
List of lost films

References

External links 

1917 films
1917 horror films
1910s fantasy comedy films
German black-and-white films
Films directed by Paul Wegener
Films of the German Empire
Golem films
German silent feature films
German sequel films
1910s comedy horror films
Lost German films
German fantasy comedy films
1917 lost films
Lost comedy horror films
1917 comedy films
Silent comedy horror films
Silent fantasy comedy films
Trilogies
1910s German films
1910s German-language films